also known as The Mute Samurai is a Japanese television jidaigeki or period drama, that was broadcast in 1973–1974. The lead star is Tomisaburo Wakayama, his younger brother Shintaro Katsu also appeared and directed episode 1. It is based on Kanda Takeshi's manga Oshizamurai Kiichihōgan.

Plot
Kiichihōgan is a samurai who had been a victim of a vicious crime, completely changing his life forever. His parents were killed and his virgin wife was violated by a skilled Spaniard named Gonzalez. 18 years later Kiichihōgan abandons the way of the samurai and he becomes a bounty hunter, taking Japans most wanted criminals. He goes on a journey to find the Spaniard and fulfill his revenge.

Cast
Tomisaburo Wakayama as Kiichihōgan
Shintaro Katsu as Manji (Nagasaki Bugyo)
Judy Ongg as Okiku
Kayo Matsuo as Kikuno
Minoru Ōki as Tokaiya
Kanjūrō Arashi as Monk Jikai
Tony Cetera as Gonzales

Episode list

See also 
Tsūkai! Kōchiyama Sōshun (1975–76) TV series Shintaro Katsu and Tomisaburo Wakayama appeared.
Kiichi Hōgen

References

1973 Japanese television series debuts
1970s drama television series
Jidaigeki television series